Orienteering Canada, formerly known as the Canadian Orienteering Federation (COF), is the governing body of orienteering in Canada. It is recognized by the International Orienteering Federation, of which it is a member.

History
Orienteering Canada, was founded in 1967 as the Canadian Orienteering Federation and initially consisted of three member associations, those of Ontario, Quebec, and Nova Scotia. The following year, Orienteering Canada became a member of the International Orienteering Federation and the first Canadian Orienteering Championships were held in Gatineau Park, Quebec on August 10. In 1972, Canada sent its first team to the World Orienteering Championships (WOC) in Staré Splavy, Czech Republic. By 1975, Orienteering Canada consisted of 8 provincial associations. In 1976, Orienteering Quebec organized "O' Ring", the first international orienteering competition held outside of Europe which attracted over 900 participants. In 2012, the organization formally changed its name to Orienteering Canada.

On top of organizing the Canadian Orienteering Championships each year, Orienteering Canada has hosted several major orienteering competitions including the Orienteering World Cup (1978, 1990, 1992), the Asia-Pacific Orienteering Championships (1990, 2002), and the North American Orienteering Championships which they have hosted every four years since 1973.

Affiliated clubs

Current

*Chapter of Orienteering New Brunswick

Defunct

References

External links
Official website of Orienteering Canada

International Orienteering Federation members
Orienteering